Neilson v A-G [2001] 3 NZLR 433 is a cited case in New Zealand regarding suing under the Bill of Rights Act for unlawful arrest.

Background
After Neilson was dismissed from his job as a private investigator, he subsequently won a personal grievance in the Employment Court against his former employer.

Part of the employers unsuccessful defence was that Neilson had pocketed some fees from one of their clients.

Eight days after losing in the Employment Court, the employer lodged a complaint with the police regarding the misappropriated money.

The police, without doing a proper investigation, and despite evidence that would suggest that no crime had occurred, a police office arrested Neilson without first obtaining an arrest warrant.

The police appealed.

Held
The court ruled that the arrest was still illegal, but did reduce the damages award to $5,000.

References

Court of Appeal of New Zealand cases
New Zealand tort case law
2001 in New Zealand law
2001 in case law